Sisurcana tabloneana is a species of moth of the family Tortricidae. It is found in Tungurahua Province, Ecuador.

The wingspan is about 27 mm for males and 32 mm for females. The ground colour of the forewings of the males is pale rust brown with refractive dots and brown suffusions. The markings are dark rust brown. The hindwings are whitish, slightly mixed with brownish on the periphery. The ground colour of the forewings of the females is pale brownish with weak brown strigulae (fine streaks) and suffusions. The hindwing have indistinct strigulation.

Etymology
The species name refers to the type locality: El Tablon.

References

Moths described in 2009
Sisurcana
Moths of South America
Taxa named by Józef Razowski